The Roman Catholic Archdiocese of Melbourne is a Latin Rite metropolitan archdiocese in Melbourne, Victoria, Australia. Erected initially in 1847 as the Diocese of Melbourne, a suffragan diocese of Archdiocese of Sydney, the diocese was elevated in 1874 as an archdiocese of the Ecclesiastical Province of Melbourne and is the metropolitan for the suffragan dioceses of Sale, Sandhurst, Ballarat, and the Ukrainian Catholic Eparchy of Ss Peter and Paul.  The Archdiocese of Hobart is attached to the archdiocese for administrative purposes. St Patrick's Cathedral is the seat of the Archbishop of Melbourne, currently Peter Comensoli, who succeeded Denis Hart on 1 August 2018.

According to the 2006 Commonwealth Census figures, there were 4,932,423 people within the province. Of these, 1,349,828 were Catholic, about 28% of the population.

History
When Melbourne, then called the Port Philip Settlement, and the surrounding area was being settled by European settlers in the 1830s, the area was a part of the Roman Catholic Ecclesiastical Province of Sydney in the Archdiocese of Sydney. In 1839, John Polding, the Archbishop of Sydney, placed Patrick Bonaventure Geoghegan in charge of the Port Philip Settlement and the first Mass was celebrated in Melbourne on Pentecost Sunday, 15 May 1839. The entire population of Port Philip in 1841 was 11,738 and the Catholics numbered 2,411.

The oldest surviving Catholic church in Victoria, St Francis Catholic Church, was built in 1841.

The Diocese of Melbourne was created in 1848 out of territory of the then Sydney archdiocese, with James Alipius Goold as its first bishop. The Catholic population of the colony was 18,000 in 1851 and had grown to 88,000 by 1857 as a result of the gold rush. James Goold was also instrumental in setting up many Catholic schools in the diocese and in introducing several religious orders devoted to education and works of charity, including the Society of Jesus, the Christian Brothers, the Sisters of Mercy, the Good Shepherd Nuns, the Presentation Sisters, the Faithful Companions of Jesus and the Little Sisters of the Poor.

When Goold was appointed Bishop of Melbourne in 1848, St Francis' Church became the cathedral church of the new diocese. Construction of a new church on Eastern Hill in East Melbourne commenced in 1858, to be called St Patrick's Cathedral. Construction of the cathedral was not completed until 1939.

On 30 March 1874, the dioceses of Sandhurst (comprising four parishes) and Ballarat were formed out of territory of the Diocese of Melbourne, with it becoming a metropolitan archdiocese of the Ecclesiastical Province of Melbourne and responsible for Sandhurst and Ballarat dioceses as suffragan dioceses. The suffragan Diocese of Sale was similarly formed on 26 April 1887 out of the archdiocese.

Under Goold's successor, Thomas Joseph Carr, additional teaching orders were introduced to the archdiocese, including the Marist Brothers, the Sisters of Charity, the Sisters of St Joseph of the Sacred Heart, the Sisters of Loreto, the Sisters of St. Joseph and the Sisters of the Good Samaritan. In 1887, 11,661 pupils attended Catholic schools of the archdiocese and that number had grown to 25,369 by 1908. The Catholic population of the archdiocese according to government census returns of 1901 was 145,333.

Until the mid-20th century, the Catholics of the archdiocese were almost all Irish or of Irish origin, when expansion of the migration programs saw the arrival of non-Irish Catholics from continental Europe. The priesthood was exclusively Irish until the early part of the 20th century, when training of native born priests began.

Ordinaries
The following individuals were Archbishops of Melbourne, with one being a cardinal while in office as archbishop, as well as having civilian honours. Their highest title is shown here:
{| class="wikitable"
!Order
!Name
!Title
!Date enthroned
!Reign ended
!Term of office
!Reason for term end
|-
|rowspan="2" align="center"| ||rowspan="2" |James Goold, OSA † ||Bishop of Melbourne ||align="center" |9 July 1847 ||align="center" |31 March 1874 ||align="right"|||Elevated to Archbishop of Melbourne
|-
|Archbishop of Melbourne ||align="center" |31 March 1874 ||align="center" |11 June 1886 ||align="right"| ||Died in office
|-
|rowspan="2" align="center"| ||rowspan="2" |Thomas Joseph Carr † ||Archbishop of Melbourne ||align="center" |29 September 1886 ||align="center" |6 May 1917 ||align="right"|||Died in office
|-
|Bishop of the Military Ordinariate of Australia ||align="center" |1912 ||align="center" |1917 ||align="right"| years ||Resigned
|-
|rowspan="3" align="center"| ||rowspan="3" |Daniel Mannix † ||Coadjutor Archbishop of Melbourne ||align="center" |1 July 1912 ||align="center" |6 May 1917 ||align="right"|||Elevated to Archbishop of Melbourne
|-
|Archbishop of Melbourne ||rowspan="2" align="center" |6 May 1917 ||rowspan="2" align="center" |6 November 1963 ||rowspan="2" align="right"| ||rowspan="2" |Died in office
|-
||Bishop of the Military Ordinariate of Australia
|-
|rowspan="2" align="center"| ||rowspan="2" |Justin Simonds † ||Coadjutor Archbishop of Melbourne ||align="center" |6 September 1942 ||align="center" |6 November 1963 ||align="right"|||Elevated to Archbishop of Melbourne
|-
|Archbishop of Melbourne ||align="center" |6 November 1963 ||align="center" |13 May 1967 ||align="right"| ||Retired and appointed Archbishop Emeritus of Melbourne
|-
|rowspan="4" align="center"| ||rowspan="4" |James Cardinal Knox † ||Archbishop of Melbourne ||align="center" |13 April 1967 ||align="center" |1 July 1974 ||align="right"|||Elevated to Prefect of the Congregation for Sacraments and Divine Worship
|-
|Cardinal-Priest of Santa Maria in Vallicella ||align="center" |5 March 1973 ||align="center" |26 June 1983 ||align="right"| ||Died in office
|-
||Prefect of the Congregation for Sacraments and Divine Worship ||align="center" |25 January 1974 ||align="center" |4 August 1981 ||align="right"| ||Elevated to the President of the Pontifical Council for the Family
|-
||President of the Pontifical Council for the Family ||align="center" |4 August 1981 ||align="center" |26 June 1983 ||align="right"| ||Died in office
|-
|rowspan="2" align="center"| ||rowspan="2" |Sir Frank Little,  † ||Auxiliary Bishop of Melbourne ||align="center" |16 November 1972 ||align="center" |1 July 1974 ||align="right"| ||Elevated to Archbishop of Melbourne
|-
|Archbishop of Melbourne ||align="center" |1 July 1974 ||align="center" |16 July 1996 ||align="right"| ||Resigned and appointed Archbishop Emeritus of Melbourne
|-
|rowspan="2" align="center"| ||rowspan="2" | ||Auxiliary Bishop of Melbourne ||align="center" |30 March 1987 ||align="center" |16 July 1996 ||align="right"| ||Elevated to Archbishop of Melbourne
|-
|Archbishop of Melbourne ||align="center" |6 July 1996 ||align="center" |26 March 2001 ||align="right"| ||Elevated to Archbishop of Sydney
|-
|rowspan="2" align="center"| ||rowspan="2" |Denis Hart ||Auxiliary Bishop of Melbourne ||align="center" |10 November 1997 ||align="center" |22 June 2001 ||align="right"| ||Elevated to Archbishop of Melbourne
|-
|Archbishop of Melbourne ||align="center" |22 June 2001 ||align="center" |1 August 2018 ||align="right"| ||Retirement and appointed Archbishop Emeritus of Melbourne 
|-
|rowspan="2" align="center"| ||rowspan="2" |Peter Comensoli ||Bishop of Broken Bay ||align="center" |12 December 2014||align="center" |31 July 2018 ||align="right"| ||Elevated to Archbishop of Melbourne
|-
|Archbishop of Melbourne ||align="center" |1 August 2018 ||align="center" |present ||align="right"| ||n/a
|-
|}

Auxiliary bishops

Current auxiliary bishops
The archbishop of the archdiocese, Peter Comensoli, is assisted by several auxiliary bishops:
Martin Ashe
Terence Curtin (Northern Region), appointed bishop 7 Nov 2014
Anthony John Ireland
There are also emeritus auxiliary bishops: 
Peter John Elliott (Southern Region), appointed bishop 30 Apr 2007

Monsignor Greg Bennet was appointed vicar general and moderator of the curia of the archdiocese in February 2012.

Former auxiliary bishops
Arthur Francis Fox † (1956-1967), appointed Bishop of Sale
Lawrence Patrick Moran † (1964-1970)
John Neil Cullinane † (1967-1974)
Thomas Francis Little † (1972-1974), appointed Archbishop here
John Anthony Kelly † (1972-1986)
Eric Gerard Perkins † (1972-1991)
Joseph Peter O'Connell † (1976-2006)
George Pell (1987-1996) †, appointed Archbishop here; future Cardinal
Peter Joseph Connors (1987-1997), appointed Bishop of Ballarat
Hilton Forrest Deakin (1992–2007)
Denis James Hart (1997-2001), appointed Archbishop here
Joseph Angelo Grech † (1998-2001), appointed Bishop of Sandhurst
Mark Benedict Coleridge (2002-2006), appointed Archbishop of Canberra-Goulburn
Christopher Charles Prowse (2003-2009), appointed Bishop of Sale
Mark Stuart Edwards, OMI (2014-2020), appointed Bishop of Wagga Wagga

Bishop Tim Costelloe, SDB was appointed as an auxiliary bishop on 30 April 2007 with responsibility for the northern region of the archdiocese. On 20 February 2012, Pope Benedict XVI elevated him to Archbishop of Perth, Western Australia.

Bishop Les Tomlinson was the auxiliary bishop for the Eastern Region.  He was appointed auxiliary bishop on 5 May 2009 and continued until he was installed as Bishop of Sandhurst in March 2012.

Bishop Vincent Long Van Nguyen, OFM Conv was the auxiliary bishop for the western region and former assistant superior general for the Conventual Franciscans for Asia and Oceania. He was appointed auxiliary bishop on 20 May 2011 and continued until he was appointed Bishop of Parramatta on 5 May 2016 and installed on 16 June 2016.

Bishop Mark Stuart Edwards, OMI was the auxiliary bishop for the Western Region, having been appointed bishop 7 Nov 2014.  He was appointed Bishop of Wagga Wagga on 26 May 2020.

Other priests of this diocese who became bishops
James Moore † , appointed Bishop of Ballarat in 1884
James Francis Corbett † , appointed Bishop of Sale in 1887
Joseph Shiel † , appointed Bishop of Rockhampton in 1912
Patrick Phelan † , appointed Bishop of Sale in 1912
John Barry † , appointed Bishop of Goulburn in 1924
James Patrick O'Collins † , appointed Bishop of Geraldton in 1930
Romuald Denis Hayes, S.S.C. † , appointed Bishop of Rockhampton in 1932
John Joseph Lonergan † appointed Bishop of Port Augusta in 1938 (did not take effect, apparently because of his death)
Matthew Beovich † , appointed Archbishop of Adelaide in 1939
Patrick Francis Lyons † , appointed Bishop of Christchurch, New Zealand in 1944
Bernard Denis Stewart † , appointed Coadjutor Bishop of Sandhurst in 1946
Ronald Austin Mulkearns † , appointed Coadjutor Bishop of Ballarat in 1968
John Aloysius Morgan † , appointed Auxiliary Bishop of Canberra (and Goulburn) in 1969
Leo Morris Clarke † , appointed Bishop of Maitland in 1976
Joseph Eric D'Arcy † , appointed Bishop of Sale in 1981
Luc Julian Matthys, appointed Bishop of Armidale in 1999
Gregory Charles Bennet, appointed Bishop of Sale in 2020

Other information

There are 232 parishes in the archdiocese and 369 diocesan priests and 16 permanent deacons. The archdiocese has a total of 294 priests and one permanent deacon in religious orders, 199 religious brothers and 1,323 religious sisters.

There is one seminary for diocesan clergy, Corpus Christi College, and three seminaries for religious clergy.

There are 331 Catholic schools in the archdiocese - 256 primary, 69 secondary and six special schools. According to the 1998 census, there were 136,387 students enrolled in Catholic schools in the archdiocese - 77,636 in primary schools and 58,751 in secondary schools.

Within the archdiocese, there are 10 Catholic hospitals, 18 homes for children, 27 for the elderly and 10 for other purposes.

Sexual abuse cases

Cases of sexual abuse in the Catholic Church have come to light in recent years involving the Archdiocese of Melbourne as well as many regional Catholic jurisdictions, both in Australia and around the world. Archbishop Denis Hart was cross-examined for three hours at the Parliamentary Inquiry over documents sent to the inquiry by victims and whistleblowers within the archdiocese.
Hart regretted the "slow start" made in the process of resolving complaints and investigating instances of abuse but "st[ood] by what [they] did since 1996 nevertheless".
The inquiry's report was due to be delivered to the Victorian parliament in September 2013.

In May 2020, newly disclosed portions of the Royal Commission into Institutional Responses to Child Sexual Abuse report, which was originally published in redacted form in December 2017, revealed that priests and clergy staff accused of abusing children within the Archdiocese of Melbourne were sometimes "dealt with" by being transferred to other parishes.

See also

 Roman Catholicism in Australia

References

External links

Catholic Archdiocese of Melbourne

 
Melbourne, Roman Catholic Archdiocese of
Melbourne
Melbourne
Melbourne